Skytta is a village in Akershus, Norway. It is located in the south of Nittedal, near Hagan and between Slattum and Gjelleråsen.

Since 1984 the corporation Rosings Industrier has been located here.

References

Villages in Akershus
Nittedal